Transitional Age is a 1968 Soviet drama film directed by Richard Viktorov.

Plot 
The film tells about a 7th grade student named Olya, who enjoys a happy life. She has not only good parents and friends, but also a talent for writing wise verses.

Cast 
 Elena Proklova as Olga Alekseyeva
 Sergey Makeyev as Kolya (as Serjosha Makeyev)
 Vitali Segeda as Vitya
 Aleksandr Barsky as Seryozha (as Sasha Barsky)
 Lena Bespalova as Lena

References

External links 
 

1968 films
1960s Russian-language films
Soviet drama films
1968 drama films